Mount Clark is a  mountain summit located within Olympic National Park in Jefferson County of Washington state. Its nearest higher peak is Sweat Spire (7,580 ft) on Mount Johnson,  to the southwest, and Mount Walkinshaw is set  to the north. It is the second highest peak in The Needles range, which is a subrange of the Olympic Mountains, and seventh highest in the Olympic Mountains. The climbing routes on Mt. Clark start at Class 3 scrambling and range up to Class 5.5 via the central South Face. Precipitation runoff from the mountain drains into tributaries of the Dungeness River.

History

The first ascent of the mountain was made on August 21, 1940 by George R. Martin and Elvin Johnson who dubbed the peak Mt. Belvedere.
 
The mountain was officially named in 1965 to honor Irving M. Clark (1882-1960), a Seattle conservationist and leader in the establishment of Olympic National Park.

Climate

Based on the Köppen climate classification, Mount Clark is located in the marine west coast climate zone of western North America. Most weather fronts originate in the Pacific Ocean, and travel northeast toward the Olympic Mountains. As fronts approach, they are forced upward by the peaks of the Olympic Range, causing them to drop their moisture in the form of rain or snowfall (Orographic lift). As a result, the Olympics experience high precipitation, especially during the winter months. During winter months, weather is usually cloudy, but, due to high pressure systems over the Pacific Ocean that intensify during summer months, there is often little or no cloud cover during the summer. In terms of favorable weather, the best months for climbing are June through September.

Gallery

See also

 Adelaide Peak
 Sundial (Olympic Mountains)
 Geology of the Pacific Northwest

References

External links

 
 Mount Clark weather: Mountain Forecast

Olympic Mountains
Mountains of Washington (state)
Landforms of Olympic National Park
North American 2000 m summits
Mountains of Jefferson County, Washington